Zdeněk Kos (born 23 June 1951) is a Czech former basketball player and coach. He was voted to the Czechoslovakian 20th Century Team in 2001. Kos was granted Austrian citizenship in 1996.

Playing career

Club career
During his club playing career, Kos won three Czechoslovakian League championships, in the years 1970, 1973, and 1975. He was also named the Czechoslovakian Player of the Year four times, in the years 1974, 1975, 1977, and 1978. From 1982 to 1985, he played for BK Klosterneuburg in Austria, winning the national championship in each season. After returning to Olomouc in 1985, he went back to Austria in 1989, where he spent one season as player/coach at TS Innsbruck, before focussing on coaching.

National team career
With the senior Czechoslovakian national team, Kos competed in the men's tournament at the 1972 Summer Olympics, the 1976 Summer Olympics, and the 1980 Summer Olympics. With Czechoslovakia, he also won bronze medals at the 1977 EuroBasket, and the 1981 EuroBasket.

Coaching career
After his playing career, Kos worked as a basketball coach. He coached the Austrian men's national team from 1990 to 1993. Kos also worked as a coach in youth basketball in Klosterneuburg and Vienna for many years. From 2006 to 2008, Kos served as coach of the women's Flying Foxes Vienna, guiding the squad to Austrian championship titles in 2007 and 2008.

Family 
His son Zdeněk Kos junior (born 1974) played basketball in the Austrian Bundesliga in the late 1990s and the first half of the 2000s.

See also
Czechoslovak Basketball League career stats leaders

References

External links
 

1951 births
Living people
Basketball players at the 1972 Summer Olympics
Basketball players at the 1976 Summer Olympics
Basketball players at the 1980 Summer Olympics
Centers (basketball)
Czech basketball coaches
Czechoslovak basketball coaches
Czech men's basketball players
Czechoslovak men's basketball players
1974 FIBA World Championship players
1978 FIBA World Championship players
1982 FIBA World Championship players
Olympic basketball players of Czechoslovakia
Sportspeople from Prague